Trapt is an American rock band formed in Los Gatos, California. Eight studio albums have been recorded to date: Amalgamation (1999), Trapt (2002), Someone in Control (2005), Only Through the Pain (2008), No Apologies (2010), Reborn (2013), DNA (2016), and Shadow Work (2020). Its lineup for all studio recordings have consisted of Chris Taylor Brown (vocals) and bassist Pete Charell (bass), with various members filling other roles over the course of their career.

Trapt's biggest commercial success was their 2002 debut single, "Headstrong", which became a crossover hit to the pop charts and peaked at number 16 on the Billboard Hot 100. Though the band's subsequent releases did not match the pop appeal of "Headstrong", the band was able to maintain a presence in the rock market throughout the decade.

History

Formation and early years (1995–1999)
The members of Trapt met in middle school in the mid-'90s, and were in an early NOFX cover band called the Swinging Udders, with Manny Terres on guitar and Aaron Azlant on lead vocals. Shortly thereafter, the band reformed and developed an act with Chris Taylor Brown (lead vocals), Simon Ormandy (guitar), Pete Charell (bass), and David Stege (drums). The band's first few rehearsals were in Ormandy's guesthouse, which had a party-like atmosphere with its loft overlooking the living room. They began playing at local venues in 1997 before any members had graduated high school. In 1998, still before graduation, they were already opening for up-and-coming fellow acts like Papa Roach. They recorded and released their first CD, Amalgamation, in 1999, which they sold at their live shows.  Their second release, the Glimpse EP, came in 2000, and another EP, 2001's self-titled Trapt, served as the band's demo.

The debut independent release by Trapt, Amalgamation, released in June 1999 and sold only in the Los Gatos, California area.

Trapt (2001–2003)
In 2001, the band signed with Warner Bros. Records and started recording their debut album, with Robin Diaz replacing Stege on the drums. On November 5, 2002 the band released their self-titled album, Trapt, which was certified platinum by the RIAA and produced a total of three singles.

Someone in Control (2004–2006)
Before releasing their next full-length album, the band released a self-titled three-track EP, released March 30, 2004, that included live versions of the "Made of Glass" and "Echo" tracks from their debut album, as well as a previously unreleased non-LP track, "Promise".

Their second full-length album, titled Someone in Control, was released September 13, 2005. It produced three singles for the band: "Stand Up", "Waiting", and "Disconnected (Out of Touch)".

Only Through the Pain (2007–2009)

Their live album titled Trapt Live!, was released on September 18, 2007. The album featured two new studio songs ("Stay Alive" and "Everything to Lose") as well as live versions of nine songs from their earlier records. On March 7, 2008, it was announced that lead guitarist Simon Ormandy had parted ways with the band. He was replaced by Robb Torres. Despite rumors indicating otherwise, Ormandy's departure was amicable, and Chris Taylor Brown continues to speak highly of Ormandy to the media, while promoting Torres as the new guitarist. On March 8, 2008, Trapt released "Who's Going Home With You Tonight?" on the band's website, a song from their then-upcoming studio album entitled Only Through the Pain. The band also posted four other songs from the upcoming album: "Black Rose", "Contagious", "Wasteland", and "Ready When You Are". On April 15, 2008, Trapt announced they would be touring as part of Mötley Crüe's Crüe Fest along with Buckcherry, Papa Roach and Sixx:A.M. The tour began July 1, 2008 in West Palm Beach, Florida.

On June 10, 2008, Trapt released "Who's Going Home with You Tonight?" as a single. They also recorded a music video for the song.

No Apologies and Reborn (2010–2013)
In March 2010, Trapt said they were wrapping up the recording process of their new record with producer Johnny K. No Apologies was released on October 12, 2010. The first single, "Sound Off", was available on iTunes on July 20, 2010. Another song, "Stranger in the Mirror", was released for free from the band's Facebook page August 11, 2010.

DNA and Shadow Work (2014–present)
In 2014, Trapt  re-released their early, out of print albums Amalgamation and Glimpse EP. and announced "The Self Titled Tour", a tour focused around their self-titled album. On June 15, Trapt announced their next studio album, DNA, and a collection of acoustic versions of songs called The Acoustic Collection. They also announced they would participate in the Make America Rock Again tour.

The band's seventh studio album, DNA was released on August 19, 2016. It was the band's poorest charting album to date, debuting and peaking at number 148 on the Billboard 200 chart. Similarly, its three singles, "Passenger", "Human", and "It's Over", failed to crack the top 20 of the Mainstream Rock Songs chart, or chart at all on the Hot Rock Songs chart. In 2018, the band released the non-album single "Come Together", which did not chart on any Billboard song charts.

In May 2020, a new studio album, Shadow Work, was announced. It released the following July, though it failed to chart in the top 200 of albums released in the US Billboard 200 chart in its release week, selling only 600 copies, an 87% drop from their prior studio album, DNA, in 2016. In the following December, multiple outlets reported that Brown had been fired from the band, though it was debunked as a hoax hours later. On January 23, 2021, drummer Mike Smith announced that he had left Trapt for "primarily political" reasons.

Musical style and influences
Trapt's sound has been described as nu metal, post-grunge, alternative metal and hard rock. AllMusic critic MacKenzie Wilson thought that the band "draws influences from grunge and heavy metal" while "absorbing the heavy rock sounds of Korn, Soundgarden, and Metallica". The band has cited Korn, Tool, Papa Roach, Pink Floyd, Pearl Jam and Genesis as influences.

Social media use
Many publications have taken note of the band's unusual use of social media accounts, run by Brown, often to lash out and attack others, something not often done from official band accounts. Music website Metal Sucks noted in 2015 that the band's official Facebook account made lengthy posts criticizing viewers of Keeping Up with the Kardashians, which devolved into the account swearing and berating commenters. The comment also included homophobic insults towards internet musician Rob Scallon, whom the band had feuded with on social media earlier in the year over the unauthorized and unattributed use of Scallon's videos. In 2017, Brown insulted commenters who disagreed with his defense of President Trump's dismissal of James Comey, and then again later in the year with critics of Brown's stance that institutional racism does not exist.

In March 2020, Metal Injection, The A.V. Club, and Slate all reported that the band's Twitter account had gone on a week-long effort of arguing with and insulting people. It began with insults of civil rights activist and bishop Talbert W. Swan II and accusations of having a "victim mentality". The comments then expanded into areas such as defending the Unite the Right rally, calling people "nerds", challenging the existence of white privilege in society, supporting Trump's "Chinese virus" rhetoric in reference to the COVID-19 pandemic, and fat-shaming women. Loudwire noted that many notable bands and musicians later responded to counter or ridicule the claims. Brown later used the band account to threaten legal action against an unflattering parody account assuming Trapt's identity, only to drop the issue on the same day once the account altered its Twitter handle to make the parody clearer. In May 2020, Brown threatened legal action against multiple Change.org petitions to keep the band's music off of the upcoming Tony Hawk's Pro Skater 1 + 2 re-release, even though the band's music never appeared on the originals nor was announced for the remaster. In the same month, Brown used the band's account to partially blame George Floyd for his own death.

In August 2020, in response to an article by music publication Consequence of Sound that asserted that the band drew a small crowd size at a festival, the band took to Twitter to berate the publication and any fans who agreed with the story's claim of poor attendance. The following month, the band's account was used to publicly berate Travis Livingston, an artist the band had commissioned, but not paid, for a lyric video for their album release that year. In October 2020, the band drew criticism when they announced their support for the far-right extremist group the Proud Boys and invited the group's Dallas, Texas chapter to their next show in town.

In November 2020, Spin reported that Facebook had deleted Trapt's page on the grounds of hate speech. In December 2020, the band's Twitter account was suspended after Brown wrote a series of Tweets that multiple publications interpreted to be about defending statutory rape, where Brown said he would 'high five' a hypothetical 15-year-old boy who had sex with a 25-year-old female teacher. In April 2021, Brown defended and clarified his stance, saying it was not meant as a defense of statutory rape, but rather, "a joke in bad taste" in relation to his thoughts on "double standard between how men need to treat women versus the other way around".

Band members

Current members
 Chris Taylor Brown - lead vocals, rhythm guitar, synths, samples (1995–present)
 Pete Charell – bass guitar, backing vocals (1995–present)
 Brendan Hengle –  lead guitar (2018–present), drums (2016–2018)

Former members
 Simon Ormandy – lead guitar (1995–2008)
 Rick Sanders – lead guitar (1995–1997)
 David Stege – drums (1995–2000)
 Robin Diaz – drums (2000–2002)
 Mike Smith - drums (2018–2021)
 Aaron "Monty" Montgomery – drums (2002–2012)
 Robb Torres – lead guitar (2008–2013)
 Travis Miguel – lead guitar (2013–2014)
 Dylan Thomas Howard – drums (2012–2016)
 Ty Fury – lead guitar (2014–2017)
 David Suddock – lead guitar (2017–2018)
 Adam Prentice - drums (2019–2020)

Timeline

Discography

Studio albums
 Amalgamation (1999)
 Trapt (2002)
 Someone in Control (2005)
 Only Through the Pain (2008)
 No Apologies (2010)
 Reborn (2013)
 DNA (2016)
 Shadow Work (2020)

References

External links
 

 
1997 establishments in California
American alternative metal musical groups
American post-grunge musical groups
Hard rock musical groups from California
EMI Records artists
Musical groups established in 1997
Musical groups from the San Francisco Bay Area
Musical quartets
Nu metal musical groups from California
Warner Records artists
Music controversies
Alternative rock groups from California